Debagarh District also known as Deogarh District is a district of Odisha state, India. Located in the north-western part of the state, it is one of the 30 administrative districts and has its headquarters at Deogarh town.

The district covers an area of 2781.66 km². The district has a population of 312,520 (2011 Census). As of 2011 it is the least populous district of Odisha (out of 30).

History

The district was created on 1 January 1994 by bifurcating the erstwhile Sambalpur district. It is domiciled by both tribal and non-tribal people in almost equal proportion.

Deogarh is the former capital of Bamanda or Bamra princely state of British India. The king of this princely state belongs to Ganga vamsi dynasty and one of the extended royal family of Gajapati emperor of Odisha.

Raja Shri Basudeb Sudhal Deb (1869–1903) was an enlightened ruler, he did much to further conditions in princely state and for the cause of Oriya nationalism. His contribution was more towards Literature, Education and Art. He established an educational institution, which is currently well known as Raja Basu Dev High School. His son had equally contributed to the social, cultural and scientific development of Deogarh. Bamanda was the first princely state to introduce postal, telegraph and electricity in India.

Bamanda is a citadel of creative artists which dates back to 5th century A.D. when Mathara Royal Family was at the helm of the Administration. After this dynasty, Ganga Rulers came into power and established their capital at Deogarh. Deogarh attained all-round prosperity during the reign of Raja Basudev Sudhal Dev, the most enlightened rulers of this clan. A new horizon was innovated in the field of communication by the foundation of Jagannath Ballav press in 1886 and publication of a weekly magazine the "Sambalpur Hitaishini" in 1889. It was during his rule that the jail, police station, post offices, Dispensaries were established and irrigation system was introduced. He had a telephone line of 78 Miles connecting Bamara and Barkote in 1900 was the longest in India during that period. Bamanda's own postal system was very developed. It got affiliated to the British Postal system in 1895. Sir Sudhal Dev, the then King of Bamanda had coined and issued postage stamps in his own Kingdom. He had promulgated paper currency also in his state.

After him, his illustrious son Raja Sachidananda Tribhuban Dev undertook the improvement activities of the erstwhile estate. The most outstanding developmental activities was the introduction of the hydro-electric system in Kodarkot water fall by which the Palace, cloth loom, Sugar factory established in 1908 at Rambhei got power supply. During the reign of Bhanuganga Tribhuban Dev, the estate of Bamra was merged with Odisha i.e. on 1 January 1948 and it became a part of the District of Sambalpur.

Geography

Among various biodiversity rich and ecologically balanced locations,"Pradhanpat" and "Kurudkut" waterfalls are with historical importance and with a salubrious atmosphere around them. Kurudkut is one of the earliest locations where hydroelectricity was generated in Asia.

The district consists mainly of hills. The Hill system of Deogarh has been categorized mainly under four ranges:
 The Khajuria Range on the north running from west–east in Badbar-Pragana of Deogarh Police Station having a maximum height of 745 Metres.
 The Pradhanpat and Kaidanta Ranges having maximum height of 743 Metres and 816 Metres on the North.
 The Pawri Range on the eastern side of the Brahmani River which is 678 Metres in height.
 The Ushakothi Range in Kansar & Reamal Police Stations. The hill ranges have elevation ranging from 610 Metres to 762 Metres from the mean Sea Levels.

The soil groups of this district are mainly Sandy, loamy soil and Red soil.

Economy
In 2006 the Ministry of Panchayati Raj named Debagarh one of the country's 250 most backward districts (out of a total of 640). It is one of the 19 districts in Odisha have been receiving funds from the Backward Regions Grant Fund Programme (BRGF).

As it is an industry less district the people depend solely upon agriculture. It is a part of the Red Corridor.

Tourism
The government has undertaken a number of efforts to support tourism in the district, based on its natural environment and cultural heritage. There are a number of tourists places listed on the official district website.

Demographics

According to the 2011 census Debagarh district has a population of 312,520, roughly equal to the nation of Iceland. This gives it a ranking of 571st in India (out of a total of 640). Its population growth rate over the decade 2001-2011 was 13.88%. Debagarh has a sex ratio of 976 females for every 1000 males, and a literacy rate of 73.07%. Scheduled Castes and Scheduled Tribes made up 16.67% and 35.33% of the population respectively.

At the time of the 2011 Census of India, 89.94% of the population in the district spoke Odia, 3.31% Mundari, 2.6% Kisan, 1.83% Sadri and 0.91% Ho as their first language.

Education
There are a number of educational institutes present out of which Raja Basu Dev High School and Govt. college at Debagarh town are the major educational institutions.In 2017 Govt. Of Odisha established one Government Polytechnic at Purunagarh in Deogarh district. Three engineering branches namely civil, electrical and mining are there ..

Transportation 
Air: – The nearest airports for visiting places of interest in Deogarh District are at Jharsuguda (98 km), Bhubaneswar (265 km) and Raipur (376 km).

Rail: - The nearest rail heads for Deogarh are at Sambalpur (90 km), Bamra on the Tatanagar-Bilaspur section of Howrah-Nagpur-Mumbai line (103 km), Jharsuguda (98 km) and Rourkela (115 km)

Road: - Deogarh is connected with NH6 (Part of AH46) (Mumbai-Kolkata) and NH200 (Raipur-Chandikhole).The city is 90 km from Sambalpur, 115 km from Rourkela and 265 km from Bhubaneswar.

Politics

Vidhan sabha constituency

Deogarh have only 1 Vidhan sabha constituency.

References

External links
 
 Debagarh at a Glance

 
States and territories established in 1994
1994 establishments in Orissa
Districts of Odisha